Warangal West Assembly constituency is a constituency of Telangana Legislative Assembly, India formed after 2009 delimitation of the earlier Hanamkonda Assembly . It is one of 12 constituencies in Warangal district. It is one of the two constituencies in the City of Warangal and part of Warangal Lok Sabha constituency

Dasyam Vinay Bhaskar of Telangana Rashtra Samithi is representing the constituency since its inception in 2009.

Wards
The Assembly Constituency presently comprises the following Wards:

Members of Legislative Assembly

Election results

Telangana Legislative Assembly election, 2018

Telangana Legislative Assembly election, 2014

Andhra Pradesh Legislative Assembly By-election, 2010

See also
Warangal East (Assembly constituency)
 List of constituencies of Telangana Legislative Assembly

References

Assembly constituencies of Telangana
Hanamkonda district